Professor Philip B. Shevlin is an American experimental chemist, based primarily at Auburn University.

Professor Shevlin is an internationally recognized research scientist. His special field of expertise is centered on the chemistry of high energy reactive intermediates. These intermediates include atomic carbon, carbenes, monovalent carbon species and other energetic molecules.

Professor Shevlin is also involved in the synthesis of a variety of carbocyclic and heterocyclic nucleoside analogs.

Curriculum vitae
 1965-1966 Research Associate, Brookhaven National Laboratory
 1966-1968 U.S. Army
 1968-1970 Research Associate, Brookhaven National Laboratory
 1970-1974 Assistant Professor, Auburn University
 1974-1979 Associate Professor, Auburn University
 1979 -1998 Professor, Auburn University
 1998- 2002 Mosley Professor of Science and Humanities, Auburn University
 2002- Professor Emeritus, Auburn university

Education
 B. S. Lafayette College, Easton, PA, 1961
 M. S. Yale University, New Haven, CT, 1963
 Ph.D. Yale University, New Haven, CT, 1966

Books
 Shevlin, P. B. and Campbell, O. A.. Concepts of Science; Kendall/Hunt: Dubuque, IA, 2nd Edition, 1995.
 Shevlin, P. B.,Concepts of Science; Kendall/Hunt: Dubuque, IA, 1993.

External links 
"University Home Page

21st-century American chemists
Living people
Year of birth missing (living people)
Lafayette College alumni
Yale University alumni
Auburn University faculty